Frederick George Cook (4 December 1922 – 17 December 1984) was an Australian rules football player for Richmond Football Club in the Victorian Football League and also served in the RAAF.  Cook was originally from Croydon and played 81 games between 1944 and 1949, including the 1944 VFL Grand Final, which Richmond lost to Fitzroy.  His identical twin brother Keith Cook also played league football for Richmond.

References

External links

1922 births
1984 deaths
Richmond Football Club players
Australian rules footballers from Melbourne
Australian twins
Twin sportspeople
Identical twins
Royal Australian Air Force personnel of World War II
Royal Australian Air Force airmen
Military personnel from Melbourne
People from Croydon, Victoria